Almo was in ancient Roman religion the eponymous god of the small river Almo in the vicinity of Rome.  Like Tiberinus and others, he was prayed to by the augurs of Rome.  In the water of Almo the aniconic stone embodying the mother of the gods, Cybele, used to be washed.  He had a naiad daughter named Larunda.

References

Roman gods
Potamoi